Arashiyama Line may refer to:
Hankyū Arashiyama Line 
Keifuku Arashiyama Main Line, see Keifuku Electric Railroad